The 2017 World Games were held in Wrocław, Poland, from July 20 to July 30, 2017.

Acrobatic gymnastics

Aerobic gymnastics

Air sports

Archery

Artistic roller skating

Beach handball

Boules sports

Bowling

Canoe polo

Cue sports

Dancesport

Finswimming

Fistball

Floorball

Flying disc

Inline hockey

Ju-jitsu

Karate

Korfball

Lacrosse

Lifesaving

Muaythai

Orienteering

Powerlifting

Rhythmic gymnastics

Road speed skating

Sport climbing

Squash

Sumo

Track speed skating

Trampoline gymnastics

Tug of war

Water skiing

Invitational sports

American football

Indoor rowing

Kickboxing

Speedway

References

External links
 Official website
 Complete results
 International World Games Association

Medalists
2017